is the debut studio album of Japanese singer Maaya Sakamoto. Production and all music composition was by Yoko Kanno, but Sakamoto wrote the lyrics for the songs "Migi Hoppe no Nikibi" and "Orange Iro to Yubikiri", and co-wrote a third, "Feel Myself", with Yūho Iwasato.

Track listing

Charts

References

Other track appearances
 "Yakusoku wa Iranai" has been used as part of the soundtrack for the Vision of Escaflowne anime.

1997 albums
Maaya Sakamoto albums
Albums produced by Yoko Kanno
Victor Entertainment albums